Trichostetha coetzeri is an afrotropical species of flower scarab beetle endemic to South Africa, where it occurs in the Cape Floristic Region. It was first described by Holm and Marais in 1988.

References

Endemic beetles of South Africa
Cetoniinae
Beetles described in 1988